The 33rd Thailand National Games (Thai:การแข่งขันกีฬาแห่งชาติ ครั้งที่ 33 “นครเชียงใหม่เกมส์”) also known (2002 National Games, Nakhon Chiang Mai Games) held in Chiang Mai, Thailand during 13 to 24 December 2002. Representing were 34 sports and 76 disciplines.  This games held in 700th Anniversary Sports Complex.

Mascot 
The official mascot of the games is the lion named "Nam Chay".

Sports 

 Aquatics (Swimming)
 Athletics
 Badminton
 Basketball
 Billiards and Snooker
 Bodybuilding
 Boxing
 Bowling
 Cycling (Track, Road, and Mountain Biking)
 Dancesport
 Equestrian
 Fencing
 Football
 Golf
 Gymnastics (Artistic and Rhythmic)
 Handball
 Hoop takraw
 Judo
 Kabaddi
 Karate
 Muay Thai
 Pétanque
 Rowing
 Rugby football
 Sepak takraw
 Shooting
 Taekwondo
 Table tennis
 Tennis
 Thai fencing
 Volleyball (Indoor and Beach)
 Weightlifting
 Wrestling
 Wushu

Top 10 Medals 

National Games
Thailand National Games
National Games
Thailand National Games
National Games